Carl Forssell (25 October 1917 – 28 November 2005) was a Swedish fencer. Competing in the team épée he won a bronze medal at the 1948 Summer Olympics, a silver at the 1952 Summer Olympics, as well as four silver and two bronze medals at the world championships of 1938–1951. Individually he won a silver at the 1950 World Championships and finished eighth at the 1952 Olympics. He was a medical doctor by profession.

References

External links
 

1917 births
2005 deaths
Swedish male épée fencers
Olympic fencers of Sweden
Fencers at the 1948 Summer Olympics
Fencers at the 1952 Summer Olympics
Fencers at the 1956 Summer Olympics
Olympic silver medalists for Sweden
Olympic bronze medalists for Sweden
Olympic medalists in fencing
Sportspeople from Stockholm
Medalists at the 1948 Summer Olympics
Medalists at the 1952 Summer Olympics
20th-century Swedish people
21st-century Swedish people